Lucas Rego, known by his stage name Lookas, is an American music producer and DJ. He is best known for his contribution to Flo Rida's charted single, "G.D.F.R.".

Career 
Rego began his music career as a teenager, when he chose music over college for a year. He credits the Miami club scene for his drive to publish.

In an interview with EDM Sauce, Rego described the music scene as "trying to figure out what the next big thing is", and shares his production experience as a motivation for improvement.

Rego's debut extended play, Lucid, was announced in early 2017, and released on Monstercat in January 2018.

Discography

Extended plays

Charted singles

As featured artist

Other singles

Music videos

References

External links
 

Living people
Future bass musicians
American electronic musicians
Monstercat artists
Atlantic Records artists
Interscope Records artists
Island Records artists
Musicians from Miami
Year of birth missing (living people)